Phinda Dlamini (born 8 November 1984) is a Swaziland international footballer who plays as a striker. As of February 2010, he plays for Green Mamba in the Swazi Premier League and has won 10 caps and scored one goal for his country.

International career

International goals
Scores and results list Eswatini's goal tally first.

References

External links
 
 
 

1984 births
Living people
Swazi footballers
Eswatini international footballers
Green Mamba F.C. players
University of Pretoria F.C. players
Jomo Cosmos F.C. players
Denver Sundowns F.C. players
Étoile Sportive du Sahel players
Swazi expatriate footballers
Swazi expatriate sportspeople in South Africa
Expatriate soccer players in South Africa
Association football forwards
People from Manzini